Rock Ignition is a hard rock band from Germany founded in 2006 by professional dancer and ex-Kamelot background vocalist Heather Shockley and Silent Force/Sons of Seasons/Headstone Epitaph bassist Jürgen Steinmetz. 
In 2007 they signed a deal with Rock Inc.(Netherlands)and released their debut EP, "I Can't Resist".
The band is influenced by hard rock acts from the 1980s like Skid Row, Whitesnake, Bon Jovi, Mötley Crüe, and Vixen.
The very first guitar player of Rock Ignition, Bas Maas, is now the actual guitarist of "metal queen" Doro Pesch.

Rock Ignition has shared the stage with bands like Uriah Heep, Jon Oliva's Pain, Axxis, Mike Tramp, Circle II Circle, Vanden Plas, At Vance, Elvenking, Kamelot, Sons of Seasons, headlined the AguiRock Festival 2008 in Tarragona (Spain) and opened the IV German Metal Meeting in Kerkrade (Netherlands).

The band released their 2nd EP "Innocent Thing" on May 17, 2013 through the record company Sound Guerilla/DA Music, produced by bassist Jürgen Steinmetz and mixed by Dennis Ward (Pink Cream 69, Unisonic).

Members 
Heather Shockley - vocals
Jürgen Steinmetz - bass
Fabian Dammers - guitar
Siggi Grütz - drums

Former Members
Bas Maas - guitar
Guido van den Brink - guitar
Marc Gerwing - drums
Uwe Lames - guitar
Oliver May - guitar
Christian Sommer - drums
Niko Chatziathanasiou - drums
Julio Pablo da Silva - drums

Discography 
EP "Innocent Thing" (2013 Sound Guerilla/DA Music)

Tracks:

Innocent Thing
Tell Me
One Love
In the Light
Streets of New York
Bonus Video: Tell Me

EP "I Can't Resist" (2007)

Tracks:

I Can't Resist
Heartbeat
Caught in the Past
Too Tough To Take
Your Truth

External links
 Rock Ignition Official Page
 Rock Ignition at DA Music
 Rock Ignition Official Myspace Page
 Rock Ignition Official Facebook Page
 Heather Shockley Official Page
 Rock Inc. Page
 The Streets metal webzine Page
 Rock Ignition YouTube Page
 Rock Ignition Last Fm Page
 Rock Ignition Concert Review of show with Jon oliva's Pain

German hard rock musical groups